Dhananjoy Tripura (Bengali: ধনঞ্জয় ত্রিপুরা) was a protester killed in police firing during the Kokborok Language Movement protests which took place in jolaibari of South Tripura district, in 1975. He is considered a martyr in Tripura.

Kokborok language movement
On March 3, 1975, the tribal residents were going to submit a deputation to Tehsil Kachari in Jolaibari under South Tripura district for the adoption of Kokborok as the official language of the state, return of illegally transferred lands, restructuring of tribal reserves and formation of ADC.

References

1975 deaths
Tripuri people